was a professional wrestling event promoted by World Wonder Ring Stardom. It took place on April 4, 2021 in Yokohama, Japan, at the Yokohama Budokan with a limited attendance due in part to the ongoing COVID-19 pandemic at the time. The preshow was broadcast live on Stardom's YouTube channel.

Storylines
The show featured eight professional wrestling matches that resulted from scripted storylines, where wrestlers portrayed villains, heroes, or less distinguishable characters in the scripted events that built tension and culminated in a wrestling match or series of matches. One of the main matches of the night was the battle between the Donna Del Mondo stablemates Maika, Himeka, Giulia and Syuri who clashed for the Goddess of Stardom Championship. The event also featured Bea Priestley's last match for World Wonder Ring Stardom, after she unsuccessfully challenged Queen Quests's Utami Hayashishita for the World of Stardom Championship.

Results

References

External links
Page Stardom World

2021 in professional wrestling
Women's professional wrestling shows
World Wonder Ring Stardom
Events in Yokohama
Professional wrestling in Yokohama